Alert in the Mediterranean (French: Alerte en Méditerranée) is a 1938 French thriller film directed by Léo Joannon and starring Pierre Fresnay, Nadine Vogel and Rolf Wanka. It was the fifth most popular film at the French box office in 1938. It also proved a success in Belgium after being released in Brussels in October 1938.

The film's sets were designed by the art director Robert Gys.

The following year it was remade in Britain as Hell's Cargo directed by Harold Huth.

Synopsis
After meeting in Tangiers three naval officers, British, French and German, are able to overcome their national antipathy and come to the assistance of a neutral ship in distress.

Cast
 Pierre Fresnay as Le commandant Lestailleur 
 Nadine Vogel as Claire Lestailleur  
 Rolf Wanka as von Schlieden  
 Kim Peacock as Le commandant Falcon  
 Jean-Claude Debully as Le petit Pierre  
 Jean Témerson as Le docteur Laurent  
 Louis Seigner as Le juge d'instruction  
 Raymond Aimos as Huguenin, le second-maître  
 Jean Tissier as Le journaliste  
 Fernand Ledoux as Martin  
 René Bergeron as Le capitaine Dulac  
 Jean Daurand as Le matelot Calas  
 Edmond Ardisson as La matelot Jaubert  
 Michael Hogarth as Le matelot anglair  
 Kroneger as Le matelot allemand 
 Robert Pizani as Le médecin du port  
 Jacques Berlioz as Le commandant du paquebot  
 Tony Murcie as Le second du paquebot  
 Frédéric Mariotti as Un homme de main  
 Jean d'Yd as Le père Blanc  
 Georges Tourreil as L'officier des Spahis  
 Georges Prieur as L'amiral  
 Duluard as Le second du torpilleur  
 Jacques Vitry 
 Henry Bonvallet 
 Marc Dantzer

References

Bibliography 
 Crisp, Colin. Genre, Myth and Convention in the French Cinema, 1929-1939. Indiana University Press, 2002.
 Driskell, Jonathan. The French Screen Goddess: Film Stardom and the Modern Woman in 1930s France. I.B.Tauris, 2015.

External links 
 

1938 thriller films
French thriller films
1938 films
1930s French-language films
Films directed by Léo Joannon
Films scored by Michel Michelet
Seafaring films
Films set in Tangier
French black-and-white films
1930s French films